Dunlea is a surname. Notable people with the surname include:

 Craig Dunlea (born 1976), rugby union player
 Lynn Dunlea (born 1974), camogie player
 Stephanie Dunlea, camogie player
 Thomas Dunlea (1894–1970), Irish-Australian Catholic priest

See also
 Dunlea Centre
 Dunlea v Attorney-General, 2000 New Zealand lawsuit